Bermuda competed at the 2004 Summer Olympics in Athens, Greece from 13 to 29 August 2004. This was the nation's fifteenth appearance at the Olympics, except the 1980 Summer Olympics in Moscow.

The Bermuda Olympic Association sent a total of 10 athletes to the Games, an equal share of five men and women, to compete in athletics, diving, equestrian, sailing, swimming, and triathlon. After achieving a fourth-place finish from Sydney, four-time Olympic sailor Peter Bromby was appointed as the nation's flag bearer in the opening ceremony.

Athletics 

Bermudan athletes have so far achieved qualifying standards in the following athletics events (up to a maximum of 3 athletes in each event at the 'A' Standard, and 1 at the 'B' Standard).

Men

Key
Note–Ranks given for track events are within the athlete's heat only
Q = Qualified for the next round
q = Qualified for the next round as a fastest loser or, in field events, by position without achieving the qualifying target
NR = National record
N/A = Round not applicable for the event
Bye = Athlete not required to compete in round

Diving 

Women

Equestrian

Eventing

Sailing

Men

Women

M = Medal race; OCS = On course side of the starting line; DSQ = Disqualified; DNF = Did not finish; DNS= Did not start; RDG = Redress given

Swimming 

Women

Triathlon

See also
Bermuda at the 2003 Pan American Games

References

External links
Official Report of the XXVIII Olympiad
Bermuda Olympic Association

Nations at the 2004 Summer Olympics
2004 Summer Olympics
Olympics